is a Japanese choreographer known as the leader of the Butoh dance group Sankai Juku, which he founded in 1975. He is the artistic director, choreographer and a dancer of Sankai Juku. He was also a co-founder of the seminal Butoh collective Dairakudakan in 1972. All Sankai Juku works since 1982 were premiered at and co-produced by Théâtre de la Ville, Paris. Sankai Juku has performed at more than 40 countries, 700 cities worldwide. Since 1997, he works as opera director as well.

Biography
In 1949, born in Yokosuka, Japan
In 1972, co-founded Dairakudakan
In 1975, founded Sankai Juku
In 1980, did his first performance abroad at the Nancy International Festival in France
In 1989, appointed to the artistic director of the Spiral Hall in Tokyo.
In 1992, presided the Jury of the International Meeting of Dance of Bagnolet.
from 2002 to 2005, president of judge for "Toyota Choreography Award"

Works
In 1977, created Amagatsu Sho (Homage to Ancient Dolls) 
In 1978, created Kinkan Shonen (Kumquat Seed)
In 1979, created Sholiba
In 1981, created Bakki, which premiered at Festival d'Avignon, France
In 1982, created Jomon Sho (co-produced by and premiered at  Théâtre de la Ville, Paris)
In 1984, created Netsu no Katachi
In 1985, direction and choreography for the photo book Luna
In 1986, created Unetsu - The Egg stands out of Curiosity
in 1987, direction and choreography for the photo book The Egg stands out of Curiosity
In 1988, created Shijima - The Darkness Calms Down in Space
In 1988, created Fushi on the invitation of Jacob's Pillow Foundation, in the U.S., music by Philip Glass, premiered at Spiral Hall, Tokyo.
In 1989, directed Apocalypse (1989), music by Takashi Kako, dance by Ismael Ivo, premiered at Spiral Hall, Tokyo.
In 1989, directed and choreographed Fifth-V (1990) for six American dancers, premiered at Spiral Hall, Tokyo.
In 1991, created Omote - The Grazed Surface
In 1993, created Yuragi - In a Space of Perpetual Motion
In 1995, created iyomeki - Within a Gentle Vibration and Agitation
In February 1997, directed Bartok's opera Bluebeard's Castle, conducted by Péter Eötvös for the Tokyo premiere.
In 1997, directed a concert of Takashi Kako Iro wo Kasanete, at Park Tower Hall, Tokyo.
In 1998, created Hibiki - Resonance from Far Away
In March 1998, at Opéra National de Lyon, France, he directed Péter Eötvös' opera Tri sestry (Three Sisters, world premiere). The opera was also presented in the 2001/02 season at Théâtre du Châtelet in Paris, at Théâtre Royal de la Monnaie in Brussels, and at the 2002 Wiener Festwochen in Austria.
In 2000, created Kagemi - Beyond the Metaphors of Mirrors
In 2003, created Utsuri - Virtual Garden
In 2005 re-created Kinkan Shonen. Amagatsu's solo parts of the original version are performed by three young dancers.
In 2006, created Toki - A moment in the weave time
In 2008, created Tobari - As if in an inexhaustible flux
In 2008, created Utsushi, which is a collage from past works. Amagatsu doesn't dance in this one.
In 2010, created Kara・Mi - Two Flows

Awards and recognition
In 1992, Amagatsu was awarded the "Chevalier de l'Ordre des Arts et des Lettres" by the French Ministry of Culture.
In 1998, Péter Eötvös’s opera "Three Sisters", which directed by Amagatsu, received "Prix du Syndicat de la critique, France".
In February 2002, "Hibiki" won the 26th Laurence Olivier Award for Best New Dance Production.
In March 2004, Amagatsu was awarded "Geijutu Sensho Prize (Art Encouragement Prize)", by the Minister of Education, Culture, Sports, Science, and Technology of Japan, for his outstanding artistic achievement.
In 2007, "TOKI" received "Grand Prix of the 6th The Asahi Performing Arts Awards" and Sankai Juku received "Kirin Special Grant for Dance."
In 2008, Péter Eötvös’s opera "Lady Sarashina", which directed by Amagatsu, received "Prix du Syndicat de la critique, France" again.

Books, photo books and other references
"Luna" (photo book) diredted and choreographed by Ushio Amagatsu, feat. Sayoko Yamaguchi and Sankai juku.
"The Egg stands out of Curiosity" (photo book)  diredted and choreographed by Ushio Amagatsu
Interviews with Ushio Amagatsu: Japan Foundation, Performing Arts Network Japan

External links
Amagatsu's profile on the Sankai Juku English site
Official Sankai Juku site
Official Dairakakudakan site

Japanese choreographers
Japanese male dancers
1949 births
Living people
People from Yokosuka, Kanagawa